Candide was the name given to various French newspapers of the 19th and 20th century.

Blanquist Candide
Candide was a newspaper founded by Gustave Tridon and Auguste Blanqui on 3 May 1865. It appeared on Wednesday and Saturday every week, and cost 5 centimes. The main collaborators on Candide were Blanqui, Tridon Villeneuve, Vaissier, Watteau, Marchand, Viette, Verlière and Sumino.

Maurrassist Candide
The name was taken up in 1924 by a weekly newspaper launched by the bookseller Arthème Fayard. This paper was one of the main literary and political weeklies of the inter-war period, and its formula inspired other papers from Gringoire on the extreme-right to Vendredi and Marianne on the left. As for itself, Candide was rooted in the  Maurrassist movement, nationalist and antisemitic: Pierre Gaxotte, personal secretary of  Charles Maurras, was a member of the collective editorial leadership until 1940; Lucien Dubech as drama critic, Dominique Sordet as music critic, Maurice Pefferkorn for sports and Abel Manouvriez the legal columnist performed the same roles for both Candide and L'Action française; Lucien Rebatet and Robert Brasillach, two young Maurrassian talents, wrote for Candide. Its numerous cartoons, particularly those of Sennep, were much appreciated by the readership.

Candide was anti-parliamentarian, anti-republican, keenly anti-communist, basically, antidemocratic, and it was not loath to antisemitic tones. After 6 February 1934 it became radicalised along with the rest of the extreme-right and a good part of the right, while not reaching the robust fascism of Je suis partout and while retaining a light tone. Hostility towards Jews and foreigners was reasserted. While it was often watchful of the danger from Germany, Candide approved of the Munich Agreement, following the general evolution of the Maurrassist movement.

Printed in large format (43x60 cm), the paper ran 80,000 copies in its first year, almost 150,000 in 1930, then at least 340,000 from 1936 onwards (465,000 in that year according to Pierre Albert, emeritus professor at Panthéon-Assas University). It exercised an important influence in politics in conservative and reactionary circles, and its literary pages was respected more widely: Albert Thibaudet, who had nothing in common with the extreme-right, wrote for Candide (although he died in 1936). Mainly from 1936 onwards, Candide tried to convince its readers of the imminence of a communist coup d'état in France.

Under the German occupation, Candide left Paris for the zone libre and supported the Révolution nationale, which embodied substantially its political ideas, particularly from 1934–1936; however it avoided the Parisian collaborationism defended by Je suis partout. It disappeared after the liberation, banned for its compromising attitude towards the Vichy regime.

Other contributors included Georges Blond and Irène Némirovsky.

Gaullist Candide
A weekly called Le Nouveau Candide which counted Jean Dutourd, Paul Gordeaux and Gilles Perrault among its columnists as well as Jean-François Steiner who would become the chair of Maurice Papon's defense committee, appeared during the course of the 1960s. According to the revelations of Constantin Melnik, special adviser for prime minister Michel Debré, this weekly received secret funding in order to counter the influence of papers opposed to the Algerian war, such as L'Express and France-Observateur.

Defunct newspapers published in France
Publications established in 1865
Newspapers established in 1924